= D'Maris =

2007–2018 South Korean restaurant chain

- Industry: Restaurant
- Founded: South Korea (April 2007)
- Defunct: 2018; 8 years ago
- Headquarters: Seoul, South Korea
- Number of locations: 10 stores (2015)
- Website: Official website

D'Maris (Korean: 드마리스) was a seafood restaurant chain based in South Korea. As of 2015, the chain had over 10 retail stores in South Korea. In 2017, D'Maris abruptly shut down 6 of its directly run stores in 2017 due to financial hardships and cancelling existing appointments at the last minute, frustrating customers who made reservations. As of 2021, all of the directly run stores are closed and existing ones are privately run.
